John Stevenson was an amateur association footballer who played as an inside forward in the Scottish Football League for Queen's Park.

Personal life
Stevenson served as a private in the Highland Light Infantry during the First World War and was killed in action.

Career statistics

References

Year of birth missing
1910s deaths
Year of death uncertain
Association football inside forwards
Queen's Park F.C. players
British Army personnel of World War I
Highland Light Infantry soldiers
British military personnel killed in World War I
Scottish footballers